This is a list of films that incorporate satire or were described as such. 
Made-for-television and animated films are also included.

See also
Satirical film

References

sat
sat